Dennis Brown (1957–1999) was a Jamaican reggae singer.

Dennis Brown may also refer to:

Dennis Brown (academic) (fl. 1970s–2010s), American professor of medicine
Dennis Brown (Bermudian footballer) (fl. 1990s–2010s), Bermudian footballer and football manager
Dennis Brown (defensive end) (born 1967), American football player
Dennis Brown (English footballer) (born 1944), English footballer
Dennis Brown (quarterback) (born ), American football player
Dennis Brown (rugby), Welsh rugby league footballer 
Dennis C. Brown (fl. 1980s–2010s), American film and television composer
Denny Brown (born 1956), former American wrestler

See also
Denis Browne (disambiguation)